CentralNic Group PLC is a British multinational internet services holding company headquartered in London, United Kingdom. Its subsidiaries provide domain name registry and registrar services, in addition to associated products and services, including web hosting, brand management, and domain parking.

CentralNic Group PLC is listed within the AIM market on the London Stock Exchange.

History

In 2000, Stephen Dyer founded CentralNic as a successor organisation to NomiNation, a company which he had founded in 1995.

In 2013, CentralNic announced that it planned to float on the Alternative Investment Market of the London Stock Exchange.

In early 2014, CentralNic acquired DomiNIC GmbH.

In 2014, CentralNic acquired retail domain name registrar Internet.BS, for US$7.5m, adding to its expanding Registrar Portfolio.

In 2015, CentralNic acquired Instra Corp and quickly integrated this retail and corporate domain name registrar into its portfolio.

In 2018, CentralNic acquired the ccTLD for Slovakia (.sk) in a €26m deal.

On 16 July 2018 CentralNic announced a merger with KeyDrive Group in a reverse takeover (according to AIM rules of the London Stock Exchange).

On 6 September 2018 CentralNic acquired Romania and Brazil-focused registrar and domain hosting provider GlobeHosting Inc. for a consideration of €2.56 million.

On 20 May 2019 CentralNic announced plans to acquire the leading Australian and New Zealand domain name and hosting reseller business TPP Wholesale for $24m AUD.

On 1 July 2019 CentralNic acquired international domain name reseller platform Hexonet Group for up to €10 million.

On 7 August 2019 CentralNic acquired international domain name retailer Ideegeo Group Ltd ("Ideegeo") for up to NZD$5.2 million (c.$3.4m USD).

In November 2019 CentralNic acquired Team Internet from Matomy Media for $48m.

In September 2020 CentralNic announced that it would acquire the Zeropark and Voluum businesses of Polish company Codewise for $36m. The deal was completed in November 2020.

In January 2021 CentralNic acquired French brand protection registrar Safebrands for $4.4m.

In October 2022, CentralNic acquired the California-headquartered domain name management business, Intellectual Property Management Co. Inc. for $7.6 million USD.

In December 2022, it was announced CentralNic had acquired a portfolio of revenue generating niche websites from multiple sellers for $ 5.2 million USD cash.

Companies within the group

CentralNic Ltd
OnlyDomains
Instra Corporation
iwantmyname
Internet Domain Service BS Corp
Moniker
domaindiscount24
Hexonet
RRPproxy
PartnerGate
1api
TPP Wholesale
Key-Systems
KeyDrive Group
DomiNIC
SK-NIC
BrandShelter
SafeBrands
nic.SAARLAND
toweb Brasil
KS Registry
Key-Systems Datacenter
GlobeHosting
Team Internet
Codewise
Wando Internet Solutions
VGL Verlagsgesellschaft mbH
AllesGesundheit
NameAction

Country code top-level domains
CentralNic Ltd, the domain name registry subsidiary of CentralNic Group PLC, registers second-level domains (SLDs) under these country code top-level domains (ccTLDs):

.bh, Bahrain
.dm, Dominica
.fm, Federated States of Micronesia
.fo, Faroe Islands
.gd, Grenada
.la, Laos; also borrowed for Los Angeles
.pw, Palau
.sk, Slovakia
.vg, British Virgin Islands

New top-level domains
CentralNic registers SLDs under these [new] generic top-level domain (gTLDs):

.art
.bar
.basketball
.best
.college
.ceo
.design
.fans
.feedback
.frl
.fun
.gent
.host
.icu
.ink
.love
.observer
.online
.ooo
.press
.protection
.realty
.reit
.rent
.rest
.security
.site
.space
.storage
.store
.tech
.theatre
.tickets
.website
.wiki
.xyz

Second-level domains
CentralNic registers subdomains under these unofficial second-level domains (SLDs):

.ae.org, for United Arab Emirates
.ar.com, Argentina
.br.com, Brazil
.cn.com, China
.com.de, Germany
.de.com, Germany
.eu.com, European Union
.gb.com, Great Britain
.gb.net, Great Britain
.gr.com, Greece
.hu.com, Hungary
.jpn.com, Japan
.jp.net, Japan
.kr.com, Korea
.no.com, Norway
.qc.com, Quebec
.ru.com, Russia
.sa.com, Saudi Arabia
.se.com, Sweden
.se.net, Sweden
.uk.com, United Kingdom
.uk.net, United Kingdom
.us.com: United States
.us.org: United States
.uy.com, Uruguay
.za.com, South Africa

None of these domains is an official SLD. Therefore, this part of CentralNic's operation is a private sub-domain registry.

These subdomains have been relatively popular and sold across a wide range of domain registrars globally, including GoDaddy, Alibaba, Network Solutions, eNom, Webfusion, GMO Internet, Inc., Gandi, Key Systems, Directi, InternetX, and many others.

References

External links

Domain name registries
British companies established in 2000
Computer companies established in 2000
Internet technology companies of the United Kingdom
Holding companies of the United Kingdom
Companies listed on the Alternative Investment Market